Korean philosophy focuses on a totality of world view. Some aspects of Shamanism, Buddhism, and Neo-Confucianism were integrated into Korean philosophy. Traditional Korean thought has been influenced by a number of religious and philosophical thought-systems over the years. As the main influences on life in Korea, often Korean Shamanism, Korean Taoism, Korean Buddhism, Korean Confucianism and Silhak movements have shaped Korean life and thought. From 20th century, various Western philosophical thoughts have strongly influenced on Korean academia, politics, and daily life.

Three Kingdoms of Korea, Northern and Southern States period, and Goryeo

Korean shamanism

Taoism

Buddhism

Korean Buddhist thinkers refined ideas originally introduced from China into a distinct form. The Three Kingdoms of Korea introduced Buddhism to Japan, from where it was popularized in the West. Today, Korean Buddhism consists mostly of the Seon lineage, which is derivative of the Chan (Zen) Buddhism of China and precursor to Zen Buddhism known in the West through Japan.

Buddhist temples can be found in most parts of Korea and many are considered national treasures.

Confucianism

One of the most substantial influences in Korean intellectual history was the introduction of Confucian thought as part of the cultural exchange from China. Today the legacy of Confucianism remains a fundamental part of Korean society, shaping the moral system, the way of life, social relations between old and young, and high culture, and even survived the modernization of the legal system.

Joseon

Neo-Confucianism

This dynasty arose out of the military dictatorships and chaos of the preceding era. Transition in this era was from Buddhism to a soldierly approach to Neo-Confucianism. Much work was done, especially on commentaries, and the Chu Hsi school represented indeed the golden age of Korean religious philosophy. Metaphysical research at this time investigated the theological relations between principle (i) and material/vital force (ki), and between as well the four beginnings (sadan), and the seven feelings (ch'ilchong); with the division of the Joseon Confucianists into two leading schools: one on "force" and one on "principles". The philosopher Hwadam ( Suh Kyungduk, 1489–1546 ) moved to integrate i and ki and spoke of Great Harmony (taehwa).

In the Four–Seven Debate with Ki Daesung, Toegye ( Yi Hwang, 1501 – 70 ), while being still dualistic, broke away from Chu Hsi by espousing the reciprocal emanation (hobal) of i and ki: with the Four, ki follows i when i becomes emanant; with the Seven, when ki becomes emanant, i ‘rides’ ki. Though he was critical of Toegye's idea that ki follows i as being dualistic, Yulgok (Yi I, 1536 – 84 ) nevertheless embraced his notion that i ‘rides’ ki: only ki is emanant and i moves its emanation; i and ki are ‘neither two things nor one thing’, as evidenced by ‘wondrous fusion’ (myohap). For Yulgok, original nature (i) and physical nature (ki) coalesce into one human nature. Toegye and Yulgok, whose thoughts culminated in an irenic fusionism, constituted the crowning phase of East Asian neo-Confucianism by exhibiting dialectical dexterity in articulating the concepts of i and ki, left unclarified by the Chinese.

Toegye also developed the neo-Confucianist concept of single-mindedness (kyung), which was a manifestation of his unequivocal humanism, as shown by his total rejection of the Mandate of Heaven (chunmyung), which still had a hold on the Chinese, including Chu Hsi. Toegye's kyung synthesized the primeval Korean sense of supreme-efforts-come-earnest-devotion (chisung) with the Confucianist notion of holding fast to mind (jik-yung); he advocated self-efforts for creating a meaningful life. In particular, his concept of single-mindedness had a lasting influence on the Japanese neo-Confucianists of the Tokugawa period.

Every major Korean neo-Confucianist shared Toegye's preoccupation with single-mindedness, which signalled new stress on praxis in the development of Korean neo-Confucianism: the fusion of the metaphysical and the physical is better brought about through action than speculation, important as theory might be. That was the point of Yulgok's integration of sincerity (sung) with single-mindedness. In this respect Korean neo-Confucianism made a break with the Cheng-Chu school of Chinese neo-Confucianism, which was overly speculative.

Silhak

During the later Joseon period, Silhak, a form of Neo-Confucianism, emerged. One of the most prominent Silhak philosophers was Jeong Yakyong.

Seohak

Donghak

Korea in 1890–1945

Western philosophy
Those who were sent to be educated in Japan, returned with limited knowledge of Western philosophy as a whole, although the German educational influence in Japan led to the beginning of interest in German idealists in Korea through indirect knowledge, with the exception of Marx, Hegel, and the dialecticians.

Christianity
The strong influence of low church Christianity, through missionary schools, led to practical American YMCA-style philosophy entering into Korea from the 1890s onwards. The discussion of Korean Christianity and Korean Christian philosophy is complicated with many divisions, and discussed in articles elsewhere.

North Korea

South Korea

Western philosophy
South Korea was mostly under the influence of the mixture of German idealism and Neo-confucianism from 1948 to early 1980s, when South Korea was ruled by authoritarian regime. After democratization in the late 1980s, philosophy in South Korea was divided by many Western schools. Marxism, Analytic philosophy, Post-Structuralism, Liberalism and Libertarianism has had great impacts on South Korean academia and society from the late 1980s onwards.

Greek philosophy and Medieval philosophy gain interests from academic philosophers and Christians. They have been studied in theological colleges and universities. As Korean Christian philosophy, Minjung theology could be mentioned, but it is not a mainstream theology in South Korean Christianity.

Eastern philosophy
Mostly, Hundred Schools of Thought, Neo-Confucianism and Taoism in East Aisa and Buddhist philosophy have been studied by academic philosophers and Buddhists. General Indian philosophy and Japanese philosophy are limitedly studied. South Korean outside of academia tend to accept Eastern philosophy as a source of life lessons.

Korean shamanism and Donghak tend to be studied in the relation with Korean nationality.

List of philosophers

Buddhist philosophers
 Seungnang (circa 6th century)
 Wonch'uk (613–696)
 Wonhyo (617–686)
 Uisang (625–702)
 Kyunyeo (923–973)
 Uicheon (1055–1101)
 Jinul (1158–1210)

Neo-Confucian philosophers 
 Jeong Mong-ju (1338–1392)
 Jeong Do-jeon (1342–1398)
 Seo Gyeong-deok (1489–1546)
 Yi Eon-jeok (1491–1553)
 Jo Sik (1501–1572)
 Yi Hwang (1501–1570)
 Yi I (1536–1584)
 Jeong Je-du (1649–1736)
 Jeong Yak-yong (1762–1836)
 Kim Jeong-hui (1786–1856)

Taoist philosophers
 Kim Si-seup (1435–1493)
 Seo Gyeong-deok (1489–1546)
 Heo Gyun (1569–1618)
 Im Yunjidang (1721–1793)
 Jeon Byeong Hun (1857–1927)

Joseon period 

These are listed by their most commonly used pen name, followed by their birth name.

  Sambong Jeong Do-jeon (1337–1398)
  Yangchon Gwon Geun (1352–1409)
  Maewoldang Kim Si-seup  (1435–1493)
  Hwadam Seo Gyeong-deok (1489–1546)
  Toegye Yi Hwang  (1501–1570)
  Haseo Kim In-hu (1511–1560)
  Gobong Gi Dae-seung (1527–1572)
  Ugye Seong Hon  (1535–1598)
  Yulgok Yi I  (1536–1584)
  Yeoheon Jang Hyeon-gwang  (1554–1637)
  Uam Song Si-yeol (1607–1689)
  Baek-ho Yun Hyu  (1617–1680)
  Ban-gye Yu Hyeong-won  (1622–1673)
  Udam Jeong Si-han  (1625–1707)
  Seogye Bak Se-dang (1629–1703)
  Hagok Jeong Je-du  (1649–1736)
  Seongho Yi Ik  (1681–1763)
  Namdang Han Won-jin (1682–1750)
  Damheon Hong Tae-yong  (1731–1783)
  Yeonam Bak Ji-won (1737–1805)
  Dasan Jeong Yag-yong  (1762–1836)
  Hwaseo Yi Hang-no (1792–1868)
  Nosa Gi Jeong-jin  (1798–1876)
  Hanju Yi Jin-sang (1818–1885)

Contemporary Korean philosophers 
 Jaegwon Kim (1934-2019)
 Do-ol Kim Yong-ok  (1948–)
 Byung Chul-Han (1959–)

See also
 Silhak
 Seohak
 Tonghak
 Minjok
 Juche
 Songun
 Essence-Function (體用)
 Korean Taoism
 Korean Buddhism
 Korean Confucianism
 List of Korean philosophers
 Contemporary culture of South Korea
 Religion in Korea
 Seonbi

References

 Choi, Min Hong, A Modern History of Korean Philosophy, Seoul: Seong Moon Sa, 1978..
 DeBary, Theodore (ed.), The Rise of Neo-Confucianism in Korea, New York: Columbia University Press, 1985.
 Ro, Young-chan (ed.), Dao Companion to Korean Confucian Philosophy, Dordrecht: Springer, 2019.

External links
 

 
History of Korea
Korean culture
Korean literature